K. M. Hossain is a Bangladesh Nationalist Party politician and the former Member of Parliament of Noakhali-4 and Noakhali-1.

Career
Hossain was elected to parliament from Noakhali-4 as a Bangladesh Nationalist Party candidate in 1979. He was elected to parliament from Noakhali-1 as a Jatiya Party candidate in 1988 by-election.

References

Bangladesh Nationalist Party politicians
Living people
2nd Jatiya Sangsad members
Year of birth missing (living people)
4th Jatiya Sangsad members